Bishopsgate Investment Management Ltd v Maxwell (No 2) [1993] BCLC 814 is a UK company law case concerning a director's duty to act for proper purposes of the company. This case is an example of what would now be Companies Act 2006, section 171.

Facts
Robert Maxwell, who controlled Maxwell Group plc and bought the Daily Mirror in 1984, fell off his yacht in the Canary Islands on 5 November 1991. It transpired he had used the company pension funds to fund his own lifestyle. Ian Maxwell was Robert’s son and a director of Bishopsgate Investment Management Ltd, which was meant to be safeguarding the company pension plans. He had signed share transfers from Bishopsgate to Maxwell Group plc for no consideration. The shares had been held on trust for a number of pension schemes. The liquidators of Bishopsgate sued Ian Maxwell to compensate for the value of the shares, on the basis that it was an improper use of the company's property.

Judgment
Hoffmann LJ held that Ian Maxwell was liable for the value of the shares, not even on the basis of any negligence, but merely by misapplying the assets.

Ralph Gibson LJ and Leggatt LJ concurred.

See also
Macmillan Inc v Bishopsgate Investment Trust plc (No 3) [1996] WLR 387

Notes

References

United Kingdom company case law
English trusts case law
Court of Appeal (England and Wales) cases
1993 in case law
1993 in British law